Albert Pierre René Maignan (14 October 1845 – 29 September 1908) was a French history painter and illustrator.

Biography 
In 1864, he left his hometown to study law in Paris, earning his diploma in 1866. During his studies he also painted and took art lessons from Jules Achille Noël. He had his début at the Salon in 1867, and continued to exhibit there throughout his life. In 1868, he travelled extensively, painting in Rouen, Córdoba, Seville and at the Suez Canal before its opening. Upon his return, he found a position in the studios of Évariste Vital Luminais.

In 1889, he won a  gold medal at the Exposition Universelle and received the Medal of Honor at the Salon in 1892. Three years later, he was named a Knight in the Légion d'honneur.
 
Most of his work is devoted to history painting, although he also produced many portraits. His Spanish and Orientalist paintings show the influence of Henri Regnault. Branching out, from 1895 to 1899 he created a series of tapestries for the Salle des Conférences at the Palais du Luxembourg.

He was also part of a group of painters who decorated the foyer at the Opéra-Comique and was one of several who were given commissions to decorate "Le Train Bleu", a famous restaurant in the Gare de Lyon, in 1900.

Gallery

Further reading
 Dominique Mallet, "Albert Maignan et son œuvre", in La Revue historique et archéologique du Maine, Vol.LXXIII, Le Mans, Mamers, 1913.
 Louise Gaggini, et al., Le Train bleu, éd. Presse Lois Unis Service, Paris, 1990

External links

 ArtNet: More works by Maignan.

1845 births
1908 deaths
People from Sarthe
19th-century French painters
19th-century painters of historical subjects
20th-century French painters
20th-century French male artists
French illustrators
French male painters
Orientalist painters
19th-century French male artists